Giulio Caracciolo, C.R. (born 1627) was a Roman Catholic prelate who served as Titular Archbishop of Iconium (1671–?)
and Bishop of Melfi e Rapolla (1666–1671).

Biography
Giulio Caracciolo was born in Naples, Italy in 1627 and ordained a priest in the Congregation of Clerics Regular of the Divine Providence.
On 1 Mar 1666, he was appointed during the papacy of Pope Clement IX as Bishop of Melfi e Rapolla; he resigned in 1671.
On 24 Aug 1671, he was appointed during the papacy of Pope Clement X as Titular Archbishop of Iconium.

References

External links and additional sources
 (for Chronology of Bishops) 
 (for Chronology of Bishops) 
 (for Chronology of Bishops)
 (for Chronology of Bishops)

17th-century Italian Roman Catholic archbishops
Bishops appointed by Pope Clement IX
Bishops appointed by Pope Clement X
1627 births
Clergy from Naples
Theatine bishops